Carlomagno Meneses (6 October 1927 – 3 December 2012) was a Peruvian boxer. He competed in the men's flyweight event at the 1948 Summer Olympics.

References

1927 births
2012 deaths
Flyweight boxers
Peruvian male boxers
Olympic boxers of Peru
Boxers at the 1948 Summer Olympics
Sportspeople from Lima
20th-century Peruvian people